Amin M. Abbosh is an Iraqi electrical engineer.

Abbosh earned a bachelor's degree in electrical engineering from the University of Mosul, then remained at the institution to complete graduate study in the subject, obtaining his master's degree in 1991 and his doctorate in 1996. He is a professor at the University of Queensland. In 2022, Abbosh was elected a fellow of the IEEE, "for contributions to electromagnetic medical imaging."

References

Living people
Year of birth missing (living people)
Electrical engineers
Iraqi engineers
University of Mosul alumni
Academic staff of the University of Queensland
Fellow Members of the IEEE
21st-century engineers
20th-century engineers